Fashion Nova is an American fast fashion retail company. 
The company primarily operates online, but it also has five brick-and-mortar locations. Fashion Nova is known to use social media marketing, particularly on Instagram. Models, celebrities, and other customers receive payments or free clothing in exchange for generating publicity about the company.

History
Fashion Nova was founded in 2006 by its CEO Richard Saghian, who started his career in the retail industry by working at his father's clothing boutique located in Los Angeles. Fashion Nova opened its first location in Panorama City, Los Angeles inside the Panorama Mall, selling inexpensive club-wear attire. In 2013, Saghian launched the e-commerce website for Fashion Nova.

In 2016, Fashion Nova launched the Curve Collection. In 2018, the company expanded to menswear with the release of their Fashion Nova Men's line.

In December 2019, the United States Department of Labor launched an investigation and found that some Fashion Nova suppliers or subcontractors hired workers who were paid as little as $2.77 an hour and that the suppliers owed $3.8 million in back wages to hundreds of workers.

In 2020, Fashion Nova pledged to donate $1 million to a number of social justice organizations, including Black Lives Matter, Know Your Rights Camp, and the NAACP Legal Defense and Education Fund.

In August 2020, Fashion Nova announced reforms to its contracting practices in support of California's proposed bill, SB 1399, that includes a mandate that its contractors and subcontractors agree to random independent audits and that their workers are paid the applicable minimum wage, which in Los Angeles is scheduled to rise to $15 an hour for employers of all size in 2021. Fashion Nova also established a toll-free hotline for workers to report abuses as well as a system of penalties for those who violate its reform efforts.

Fashion Nova launched Maven Beauty, an affordable beauty brand, in October 2020.

Founder Richard Saghian rarely speaks with reporters but is known to collect real estate, including homes previously owned by Avicii and Netflix executive Ted Sarandos. He is not married and has no children.

Collaborations 
In November 2018, Fashion Nova released its line with rapper Cardi B. The collection launched at a "Party with Cardi" event, with performances by Cardi B, Saweetie, and Brianna Perry. It was a very successful launch, selling out in seconds. Since this collaboration, Fashion Nova has been endorsed by many celebrities and influencers such as Teyana Taylor, Blac Chyna, and Christina Milian. The store has a seasonal Halloween costume line, making its items debut alongside its most popular ambassadors at Halloween events.

Fashion Nova launched a second season of the Cardi B collection in May 2019, with performances by Cardi B, YG, Blueface, and Lil Nas X.

In April 2020, Fashion Nova created Fashion Nova Cares, an initiative focused on supporting social causes. That same month, Fashion Nova Cares partnered with Cardi B to donate $1,000 an hour for over 40 days to those affected by COVID-19, donating a total of $1 million.

In October 2020, Playboy filed a complaint against Fashion Nova Inc. in Los Angeles, for its trademark rights in its Bunny costume. The Bunny mark contains the costume's "iconic bunny ears, tail, ribbon name tag, wrist cuffs, corset, and bowtie collar," according to the lawsuit.

In November 2020, Fashion Nova released its line with Megan Thee Stallion, including statement pieces and an assortment of crafted denim for those  and taller. The collection reportedly generated $1.2 million in sales within the first 24 hours of availability.

Megan Thee Stallion and Fashion Nova partnered again in March 2021 for the rapper's Women on Top philanthropic initiative, which seeks to empower women by supporting their educational and business endeavors through scholarships, grants, and donations. Every day throughout Women's History Month, Fashion Nova Cares provided $25,000 or more to female entrepreneurs, students, and women-focused charities. She also launched a swimwear line in June.

References 

Clothing retailers of the United States
Retail companies based in California
Companies based in Los Angeles
American companies established in 2006
2010s fashion
2020s fashion